Kappal Muthalaali (English translation: The Ship Owner) is a 2009 Indian Malayalam-language film directed Thaha starring Ramesh Pisharody in title role Sarayu as lead actress. The movie also marked the debut of Pisharody and Sarayu in a lead role.

Plot 
Bhoominathan keeps big aspirations in his life. His dreams are all revolving around a property in the city, which he inherited. Bhoominathan finds that making a tourist resort in the land, is the best possible business which can bring him big returns. He starts to realise his plans to build a resort by digging down for making a good basement. And he finds to his astonishment, the archaic remnants of a ship.

Bhoomi takes no time to inform the archaeological department which lands him to further trouble and his project of resort building gets blocked. Bhoomi has got a friend in Radhika, who also works with the same department. Now with the help of some fresh ideas from her, he plans to venture into a new arena of business. The movie goes on to tell more lightly, how some unexpected happenings can change the fate of a youth.

Cast 
 Ramesh Pisharody as Bhoominathan
 Mukesh as Venkittaraman 
 Sarayu as Radhika
 Jagadeesh as Thulaseedharan
 Kaviyoor Ponnamma
 Suraj Venjaramood
 Jagathy Sreekumar as Dubai Chandy
 Salim Kumar
 Bheeman Raghu
 Thilakan as Yamarajan (cameo)
 Bijukuttan
 Narayanankutty
 T. P. Madhavan
 Jaffer Idukky
 Shalu Kurian

References

External links
 
 http://entertainment.oneindia.in/malayalam/top-stories/2009/thaha-kappal-muthalaali-170909.html
 http://www.musix.co.in/Kappal%20Muthalaali%20review.html

2009 films
2000s Malayalam-language films